Safura Alizadeh Aliyev (born 20 September 1992) is an Azerbaijani pop singer. In 2009, she became the winner of the national contest "Pop Idol" (season 8). In 2010, Safura took part in the Eurovision Song Contest, where she brought Azerbaijan on 5th place in the final, with the song Drip Drop, where she only was 17 years old. With Drip Drop, she reached the sales charts in Germany, Austria, Sweden, Norway, Belgium and Turkey.

Early life 
Safura's father is a professional painter and her mother is a pianist. Safura began singing when she was very young and made her first stage appearance at the age of 6. In the course of her career, she sang in children's bands "Sharg Ulduzlari" and "Bulbullar". Safura took up violin and piano lessons at the "Baku Musical School No2", but later also learned to play the saxophone. Safura graduated school No23 in Baku.

She became the winner of the national contest "Pop Idol" (season 8).

Safura attended the Azerbaijan State University of Culture and Arts, then she moved to Sweden.

Eurovision Song Contest 2010 

On 2 March 2010, Safura won the Azerbaijani national final, decided by jury and represented Azerbaijan in the Eurovision Song Contest 2010, which was held in Oslo, Norway. Safura performed at the contest with the song "Drip Drop", written by Anders Bagge, Stefan Örn and Sandra Bjurman. Shortly after she performed on the concert in Ukraine and exchanged wishes with Ukrainian performer Vasyl Lazarovych. The video for the song was directed by a well known film director Rupert Wainwright, and choreographed by JaQuel Knight, who worked with Beyoncé and Britney Spears. Knight also designed the choreography of Safura's stage performance in Oslo.

On 1 May 2010, Safura began her promotional tour, and visited Germany, the Netherlands, Belgium, Switzerland, Poland, Russia, Ukraine, and Sweden.

After Eurovision 
The singer performed in Bydgoszcz Hit Festival with the song Drip Drop. She was the official spokesperson of the Azeri voting in Eurovision Song Contest 2011 and 2012.

Safura has signed a five year contract with the Swedish record company Zaphire. Her first album, titled It's My War, was released on 18 June 2010. Drip Drop was the first single released from It's My War. The second single to be released from It's My War was confirmed to be March On, which was released on 20 August.

Safura announced that she had terminated her contract with Euteria due to an intolerable limitations that the company had placed on her, including limiting her trips to her home country and banning her from using online social networks. She noted the possibility of seeking a contract with another European company.

In 2019, Safura released her third single High On Your Love. On 5 August 2021, Safura released her second album titled Möcüze. On 25 November 2021, she released her third single L.O.V.E.

Safura joined the ruling New Azerbaijan Party in 2011.

Discography

Albums 
2010: It's My War
2021: Möcüze

Singles

Personal life 
On 5 July 2013, Safura married Farhad Aliyev, son of Azerbaijan's Minister of Industry and Energy of Azerbaijan Republic Natig Aliyev. Safura and her husband have three children: two sons born in 2014 and 2019 and a daughter born in 2017.

See also 
Azerbaijani pop music
Azerbaijani rock
Azerbaijani hip hop

References

External links 

Safura Alizadeh – Azerbaijani entry to the Eurovision Song Contest 2010 in Oslo, Norway
Drip Drop – Official Eurosong of Safura Alizadeh at Eurovision Song Contest 2010
Eldar & Nigar – New Azerbaijani entry to the Eurovision Song Contest in Düsseldorf, Germany
Safura's address on the National Day of Norway
Safura's page on Zaphire Group website

1992 births
Living people
Eurovision Song Contest entrants for Azerbaijan
21st-century Azerbaijani women singers
Azerbaijani saxophonists
Eurovision Song Contest entrants of 2010
Musicians from Baku
English-language singers from Azerbaijan
21st-century saxophonists
Azerbaijani pop musicians
Azerbaijani women singer-songwriters
Azerbaijan State University of Culture and Arts alumni